Pietro Chiari (25 December 1712 – 31 August 1785) was an Italian catholic priest, playwright, novelist and librettist.

Life
Chiari was born and died in Brescia. He was a Jesuit until leaving the order in 1747. From 1747 to 1762 he was court poet of Duke Francis III of Modena, in Venice, although not at the public cost.  During this period he wrote nearly 60 comedies, which from 1761 or earlier often brought him into conflict with his rival Goldoni.  With a deep hatred for the style of Molière, Chiari made comédie larmoyante fashionable in Italy under the name commedia fiebile.  He also edited the Gazzetta Veneta from 1761 to 1762, when he returned to his birthplace to spend his final years.

Works

Comedies

Tragedies
 Catilina, based on the life of Catilina
 Giulio Cesare, based on the life of Julius Caesar
 Kouli-Kan, based on the life of Timur
 La Morte di Kouli-Kan
 Marco Antonio triumviro, based on the life of Mark Antony
 Marco Tullio Cicerone, based on the life of Cicero

Novels
La Filosofessa italiana (1753)
La Cantatrice per disgrazia, osia le avventure della Marchesa N. N. scritte da lei medesima (1754)
Le Memorie di madama Tolot ovvero la giocatrice di lotto (1757)
La Bella Pellegrina (1759)
La Francese in Italia (1759)
La Veneziana di spirito (1762)
 L'Americana ramminga, cioè Memorie di Donna Jnnez di Quebrada. Scritte da lei stessa, e ora pubblicate da M. G. Di S. Sua confidente amica (1763; work attributed to Chiari) 
 La Ballerina onorata, o sia Memorie d'una figlia naturale del duca N. V. scritte da lei medesima
 La Fantasima, aneddoti castigliani d'una dama di qualità, scritti da lei medesima
Memorie del Barone di Trenk Comandante de' Panduri (1784; date it came to light)
 I privilegi dell'ignoranza - Lettere d'una Americana ad un Letterato d'Europa (1784)

Bibliography 
  Alessio Giannanti, L'America di Pietro Chiari. Tra attribuzioni apocrife e riflessioni filosofiche
  Carmelo Alberti, Convegno Un rivale di Carlo Goldoni, l'abate Chiari e il teatro europeo del Settecento, Vicenza, N. Pozza, 1986
  Giuseppe Antonelli, Alle Radici della letteratura di consumo : la lingua dei romanzi di Pietro Chiari e Antonio Piazza, Milan, Istituto di propaganda libraria, 1996
  Luca Clerici, Il Romanzo italiano del Settecento : il caso Chiari, Venezia, Marsilio, 1997
  Xavier de Courville, Un Artisan de la rénovation théâtrale avant Goldoni Luigi Riccoboni, Paris, 1894
  Pietro Toldo, L’Œuvre de Molière et sa fortune en Italie, Turin, E. Loescher, 1910

1712 births
1785 deaths
Italian opera librettists
Italian dramatists and playwrights
Former Jesuits
Italian male dramatists and playwrights